Beat Down is a song by music producers Steve Aoki and Angger Dimas, featuring vocals from Australian rapper Iggy Azalea. The song was included on the re-release of Aoki's debut studio album, entitled Wonderland (Remixed), which was released on July 10, 2012.

Background
Aoki released his long-awaited debut studio album, Wonderland, on January 10, 2012, featuring guest vocalists and musicians LMFAO, Kid Cudi, Kay, Travis Barker, will.i.am aka Zuper Blahq, Wynter Gordon, Rivers Cuomo, Lil Jon, Chiddy Bang, Lovefoxxx of CSS, Big John Duncan (former guitarist of the punk band The Exploited), and others, through his record label Dim Mak. A remix album was released shortly after, on July 10, 2012, Wonderland (Remixed), featuring a new original track that would become the lead single of the project, "Beat Down," with fellow Indonesian electronic producer/DJ Angger Dimas and also featured up-and-coming Australian rapper Iggy Azalea, who had been featured on the cover of hip-hop magazine XXL's buzzed-about annual "Top 10 Freshman List" and announced signing a deal with Southern rapper T.I.'s Grand Hustle Records.

Critical reception
Becky Bain of Idolator claimed the track is "a solid tune that is ready to pump you up" and complimented Azalea's guest appearance adding that "the Aussie rapper lays down some serious flow." DJ Booth also praised it saying, "If you're a fan of EDM and a lover of 808s and snares, then you'll probably wear out the repeat button after listening to this single. Iggy does surprisingly well with the complex track as she professes that she's well versed in the art of the beat down with lyrics like, "It's a party on your face and I'm about to dance on it"," while Noisey drew comparisons to Major Lazer's 2009 single "Pon de Floor".

Chart performance
While the song only made it to number 44 on the UK Singles Chart, a comparative disappointment compared with Aoki's 2010 single "I'm in the House", featuring Zuper Blahq and his 2011 single "No Beef" featuring Afrojack and Alyssa Palma, it served as a platform for Azalea, who went on to have three Top 20 hits in 2014. "Beat Down" first entered the UK Dance Chart at number 21 and the UK Indie Chart at number 13 on June 2, 2012. It reappeared three months later with greater success peaking at number 44 in the UK Singles Chart and number 10 in the UK Dance Chart. A week later, it fell back down to number 22 in the UK Dance Chart.

Live performances and other use
Aoki, Dimas and Azalea have included the track on their live shows setlists regularly since its release, including the rapper's 2014 The New Classic Tour. "Beat Down" was also featured on the 2015 romantic comedy film Trainwreck.

Music video
The official music video, directed by Alex/2Tone of What You Steal productions, was released on July 19, 2012. Aoki, Azalea and Dimas all make appearances in the visuals.

Track listing

Charts

Weekly charts

Release history

References

2012 singles
Steve Aoki songs
Iggy Azalea songs
Songs written by Iggy Azalea
Ultra Music singles
Songs written by Steve Aoki
Moombahton songs